Bournedale is a village in the town of Bourne in Barnstable County, Massachusetts fronting Sagamore Beach, Buzzards Bay and the middle of the Cape Cod Canal. Along with Buzzards Bay and Sagamore Beach, it is one of only three communities in Barnstable County that are north of the Cape Cod Canal.

References

Bourne, Massachusetts
Populated coastal places in Massachusetts
Villages in Barnstable County, Massachusetts
Villages in Massachusetts